The 2017–18 Toto Cup Al was the 33rd season of the third-important football tournament in Israel since its introduction and the 12th tournament involving Israeli Premier League clubs only. 

The competition is held in two stages. First, fourteen Premier League teams were divided into three groups, five teams in groups A and B and four teams in group C, the teams playing against each other once. The best three teams from groups A and B and the best two teams from group C will advance to the quarter-finals, which will be played over two-legged ties. The semi-finals and the final are then played as one-legged matches in a neutral venue.

Hapoel Be'er Sheva was the defending champion.

In the final, held on 14 December 2017, Maccabi Tel Aviv had beaten Hapoel Be'er Sheva 1–0.

Group stage
Groups were allocated according to geographic distribution of the clubs, with the northern clubs allocated to Group A, In Group B allocated the two teams from Tel Aviv, one team from Petah Tikva, one from Netanya and one more team from Ra'anana. The southern clubs allocated to Group C (including Beitar Jerusalem). 

The matches started July 29.

Group A

Group B

Group C

Knockout stage
All times are in Israel Standard Time

Quarter-finals

Semi-finals

Final

Notes

References

External links
 Official website  

Al
Toto Cup Al
Toto Cup Al